Vyacheslav Viktorovich Krykanov (born 3 January 1971) is a Russian professional football coach and a former player. He is the goalkeepers' coach with FC Murom.

Honours
 Russian Second Division Zone West best goalkeeper: 2004.

External links
 

1971 births
Footballers from Moscow
Living people
Soviet footballers
Russian footballers
Association football goalkeepers
FC Asmaral Moscow players
FC Tekstilshchik Kamyshin players
FC Metallurg Lipetsk players
FC Elista players
FC Neftekhimik Nizhnekamsk players
FC Kyzylzhar players
FC Arsenal Tula players
Russian Premier League players
Kazakhstan Premier League players
Russian expatriate footballers
Expatriate footballers in Kazakhstan
Russian expatriate sportspeople in Kazakhstan
Russian football managers
FC FShM Torpedo Moscow players
FC Torpedo Vladimir players